Ashutosh Lobo Gajiwala (born 17 May 1993) is an Indian actor and entrepreneur. Gajiwala is best known for his 2008 role as the young Salim Malik in the film Slumdog Millionaire. He received the Screen Actors Guild Award for Outstanding Performance by a Cast in a Motion Picture for the film.

Gajiwala is based in Mumbai and resides with his family in Mumbai's Mahalaxmi area. His father, Kalpesh Gajiwala, is a plastic surgeon, and his mother Astrid Lobo is a doctor. He has two older sisters, Gayatri and Nivedita. Gajiwala attended the Campion School in Colaba. As a child, he was known for being an active theatre actor and singer. He later attended St. Xavier's College, Mumbai, and graduated with a bachelor's degree in Mass Media. Even in his early days, Gajiwala evinced a keen interest in entrepreneurial ventures and the start-up ecosystem. The work of Dr. Verghese Kurien and the Amul Model served as an inspiration to explore the aggregator-effect in civil movements and the use of technology in mass empowerment. In 2016, a long-standing dream of Gajiwala's saw the light of day when Polit completed its first round of funding. Gajiwala's venture, Polit, is an online voting platform that lets people ask and answer polls based on personal preference. Polit functions as a real-time national level register of public opinion, providing data on the collective perception of key issues and programmes.

Filmography 
2008: Slumdog Millionaire

References

External links
 

1993 births
Living people
21st-century Indian male actors
Indian male child actors
Indian male film actors
Indian male voice actors
Male actors in Hindi cinema
Male actors from Mumbai
Outstanding Performance by a Cast in a Motion Picture Screen Actors Guild Award winners